Cercopimorpha sylva is a moth of the subfamily Arctiinae. It was described by Schaus in 1920. It is found in Costa Rica and Guatemala.

The wingspan is about 28 mm. The forewings are dark slate, tinged with lilacine and with dark brown veins. The hindwings are fuscous, somewhat semihyaline through and beyond the cell. Adults have been recorded in forests during the day.

References

Moths described in 1920
Arctiinae